Jailbirds is a 1991 American TV movie directed by Burt Brinckerhoff.

Plot
Two convicts, one white, one black, escape from prison while handcuffed together.

Cast
Phylicia Rashad as Janice Grant
Dyan Cannon as Rosie Lacroix
Dakin Matthews as Sheriff Dobbs
David Knell as Deputy Baxter
Ahmad Rashad as Larry Braddock
Bethany Wright as Loretta
Dennis Letts as Poppa 
T.E. Russell as Clemmons
Clyde Kusatsu as Kasaki
Maria Arita as Kelli
Anne Haney as Haydee
Ritch Brinkley as Beetle

References

External links

1991 television films
1991 films
Films directed by Burt Brinckerhoff